Highway 731 is a highway in the Canadian province of Saskatchewan. It runs from Highway 20 near Strasbourg to Highway 310 near Ituna.

History 
Before 2005, Highway 731 was a much shorter highway that ended at its intersection with Highway 641.

Intersections from west to east

See also 
Roads in Saskatchewan
Transportation in Saskatchewan

References 

731